Megabulbus is a genus of spiders in the family Oonopidae. It was first described in 2007 by Saaristo. , it contains only one species, Megabulbus sansan, found in Israel.

References

Oonopidae
Monotypic Araneomorphae genera
Spiders of Asia